The Italian ambassador to Guatemala City is the official representative of the Government in Rome to the Government of Guatemala.

List of representatives 
<onlyinclude>

References 

Guatemala
Italy
Guatemala–Italy relations